Tyke Tolbert (born September 15, 1967) is an American football coach and former player who is the wide receivers coach for the Chicago Bears of the National Football League (NFL). Tolbert previously served as wide receivers coach for the Arizona Cardinals, Buffalo Bills, Carolina Panthers, Denver Broncos and New York Giants.

College playing career
Tyke attended Louisiana State University (LSU), where he played wide receiver for the LSU Tigers football team.

Coaching career

College Coaching
Tolbert started his coaching career as a graduate assistant at LSU in the spring of 1994 and quickly transferred to Northeast Louisiana to also work as a graduate assistant in the fall. He would go on to coach wide receivers at Ohio in the spring of 1995, before once again returning in the fall to Northeast Louisiana, where he assisted in coaching the team’s tight ends for three seasons.
He would then go on to coach tight ends at Auburn in the 1998 season. Tyke would spend the next three years (1999-2001) as the wide receivers coach/recruiting coordinator at Louisiana-Lafayette, followed by a year  serving as a tight ends coach/recruiting coordinator at Florida in 2002, before making the jump to the NFL the following season.

Start in the NFL

Tyke was a part of the NFL's Minority Internship Program with the Detroit Lions in training camp  during 1997, and once again in 2001 with the Cardinals.

Arizona Cardinals
Tyke’s first official position in the NFL was as the wide receivers coach for the Arizona Cardinals in 2003. He would go on to help rookie wide receiver Anquan Boldin earn offensive rookie of the year.

Buffalo Bills
Tolbert would spend 6 years coaching wide receivers for the Bills.

Carolina Panthers
In 2010 Tolbert was the wide receivers coach for the Carolina Panthers.

Denver Broncos
Tolbert was the wide receivers coach for the Denver Broncos from 2011 until the end of the 2017 season.
On February 7, 2016, Tolbert was part of the Broncos coaching staff that won Super Bowl 50. In the game, the Broncos defeated the Carolina Panthers by a score of 24–10.

New York Giants
On January 24, 2018, Tolbert joined the New York Giants to serve as wide receivers coach under new head coach Pat Shurmur. Following the appointment of Joe Judge as head coach in January 2020, Tolbert was retained in his role.

Chicago Bears
On February 2, 2022, Tolbert joined the Chicago Bears to serve as the wide receiver coach & passing game coordinator under head coach Matt Eberflus.

References

External links
 Tyke Tolbert New York Giants profile

1967 births
Living people
African-American coaches of American football
African-American players of American football
American football wide receivers
Arizona Cardinals coaches
Auburn Tigers football coaches
Buffalo Bills coaches
Carolina Panthers coaches
Denver Broncos coaches
Florida Gators football coaches
Louisiana Ragin' Cajuns football coaches
Louisiana–Monroe Warhawks football coaches
LSU Tigers football players
New York Giants coaches
Ohio Bobcats football coaches
People from Conroe, Texas
Sportspeople from Texas
Conroe High School alumni
21st-century African-American people
20th-century African-American sportspeople
Chicago Bears coaches